The Temple of Jupiter Stator ("Jupiter the Sustainer") was a temple of Ancient Rome in the southern Campus Martius. It was destroyed in 64 AD in the Great Fire of Rome.

The Temple was named after the god Jupiter, in his form of Jupiter Stator (Jupiter the Sustainer). Together with the Temple of Juno Regina (Juno in the form of "Queen Juno") and the enclosing Porticus Metelli (later rebuilt as the Porticus Octaviae), it was built by Quintus Caecilius Metellus Macedonicus after his triumph, in 146 BC. It is referred to as aedes Iovis Metellina and aedes Metelli. It was inside the porticus Metelli, close to the Circus Flaminius, and its exact site is known to have been beneath the church of Santa Maria in Campitelli. The Temple of Juno Regina was just west of it, on the opposite side of the Via della Tribuna di Campitelli.

It is not stated in explicitly by Velleius that Metellus built both temples, but that is the natural inference from the passage. He is also said to have been the first to build a temple in Rome entirely of marble, and which probably applies to both structures. In front of the temples Metellus placed Lysippus' equestrian statues of Alexander the Great's generals, and in them were several famous works of art.

According to Vitruvius (iii.2.5), the Temple of Jupiter was the work of Hermodorus of Salamis. It was a Hexastyle peripteral building with six columns along the short sides and eleven on the long sides. The space between the columns was equal to that between the columns and the wall of the cella. As there were no inscriptions on the temples and evidently representations of a lizard and a frog among the decorations (σαύρα, βάτραχος), the legend arose that the architects were two Spartans, Saurus and Batrachus and that as the decorations in the temple of Jupiter belonged to that of Juno and vice versa, the statues of the deities had been set up in the wrong cellae by the mistake of the workmen. The idea that an Ionic capital, now in S. Lorenzo fuori le Mura, has anything to do with the temples has generally been abandoned.

In 64 AD, the Great Fire of Rome ravaged much of the city, completely devastating three of and partially destroying seven of the city's fourteen districts. The Temple of Jupiter Stator was completely destroyed, along with the House of the Vestals, the Domus Transitoria (Nero's first palace), the Temple of Luna, and much of Rome.

See also
Temple of Jupiter Stator (3rd century BC)
List of Ancient Roman temples

Notes

External links

Porticus Octaviae temple

Jupiter Stator
2nd-century BC religious buildings and structures
Stator
Destroyed temples